"King / Food for Thought" is the debut single by British reggae band UB40. It was released as a double A-side in early 1980 and reached number four on the UK Singles Chart and number one in New Zealand.

"King" is a song written about Martin Luther King Jr., questioning the lost direction of the deceased leader's followers and the state of mourning of a nation after his death.

According to Robin Campbell, the lyrics of "Food for Thought" relate to "the hypocrisy of Christmas, the fact that there are starving people in Africa and here we are all sat around eating our Christmas dinner and praising the Lord". Campbell regards the song as a Christmas song.

The original single version of "Food for Thought" is slightly shorter compared to the Signing Off album version, with the album version including a break using a synthesiser reverb (an early example of their mixing techniques that can be found on their album Present Arms in Dub).

"King / Food for Thought" was the first release of a new record label, Graduate Records, a company based, like the band, in Birmingham. It was the first single to reach the UK top 10 without the backing of a major record company.

Charts

Certifications

See also
List of number-one singles from the 1980s (New Zealand)

References

1980 songs
1980 debut singles
UB40 songs
Number-one singles in New Zealand
British Christmas songs
UK Independent Singles Chart number-one singles